The Yarlung Tsangpo Grand Canyon, also known as the Yarlung Zangbo Grand Canyon, the Tsangpo Canyon, the Brahmaputra Canyon or the Tsangpo Gorge ('), is a canyon along the Yarlung Tsangpo River in Tibet Autonomous Region, China. The river then enters Arunachal Pradesh and eventually becomes the Brahmaputra.

Canyon depth

As the canyon passes between the peaks of the Namcha Barwa (Namjabarwa) and Gyala Peri mountains, it reaches an average depth of about 5,000 m (16,000 feet) around Namcha Barwa. The canyon's average depth overall is about 2,268 m (7,440 feet), the deepest depth reaches 6,009 m (19,714 feet). This is the deepest canyon on land.

Ecosystem
The gorge has a unique ecosystem with species of animals and plants barely explored and affected by human influence. Its climate ranges from subtropical to Arctic. The rare takin is one of the animals hunted by the local tribes.

The Everest of Rivers

Western interest in the Tsangpo began in the 19th century when British explorers and geographers speculated where Tibet's east-flowing Tsangpo ended up, suspecting the Brahmaputra. Since British citizens were not allowed to enter Tibet they recruited Indian "pundits" to do the footwork. Kinthup from Sikkim entered the gorge near Gyala, but it proved to be impenetrable. In 1880 Kinthup was sent back to test the Brahmaputra theory by releasing 500 specially marked logs into the river at a prearranged time. His British boss Captain Henry Harman posted men on the Dihang-Brahmaputra to watch for their arrival. However, Kinthup was sold into slavery, escaped, and ended up employed at a monastery. On three leaves of absence he managed to craft the logs, send a letter from Lhasa with his new intended schedule, and send off the logs. Four years had passed. Unfortunately his note to alert the British got misdirected, his boss had left India, and nobody checked for the appearance of the logs.

In 1913, Frederick Marshman Bailey and Henry Morshead launched an expedition into the gorge that finally confirmed that the Tsangpo was indeed the upper Brahmaputra. Frank Kingdon-Ward started an expedition in 1924 in hopes of finding a major waterfall explaining the difference in altitude between the Tsangpo and the Brahmaputra. It turned out that the gorge has a series of relatively steep sections. Among them was a waterfall he named "Rainbow Falls", not as big as he had hoped.

The area was closed after China invaded Tibet and disputed the location of the border in the Sino-Indian War. The Chinese government resumed issuing permits in the 1990s. Since then the gorge has also been visited by kayakers. It has been called the "Everest of Rivers" because of the extreme conditions. The first attempt was made in 1993 by a Japanese group who lost one member on the river. In October 1998 an expedition sponsored by the National Geographic Society attempted to kayak the entire gorge. Troubled by unanticipated high water levels, it ended in tragedy when Doug Gordon was lost. In January–February 2002 an international group with Scott Lindgren, Steve Fisher, Mike Abbott, Allan Ellard, Dustin Knapp, and Johnnie and Willie Kern completed the first full descent of the upper Tsangpo gorge section.

The largest waterfalls of the gorge (near Tsangpo Badong,) were visited in 1998, by a team consisting of Ken Storm, Hamid Sarder, Ian Baker and their Monpa guides. The falls and rest of the Pemako area are sacred to Tibetan Buddhists who had concealed them from outsiders including the Chinese authorities. In 2005 Chinese National Geography named them China's most beautiful waterfalls.

Yarlung Tsangpo Hydroelectric and Water Diversion Project
While the government of the PRC has declared the establishment of a "Yarlung Tsangpo Grand Canyon National Reservation", there have also been governmental plans and feasibility studies for a major dam to harness hydroelectric power and divert water to other areas in China. The size of the dam in the Tsongpo gorge would exceed that of Three Gorges Dam as it is anticipated that such a plant would generate 50,000 megawatts of electricity, more than twice the output of Three Gorges. It is feared that there will be displacement of local populations, destruction of ecosystems, and an impact for downstream people in India and Bangladesh. The project is criticized by India because of its potential negative impact upon the residents downstream.

In 1999, R.B. Cathcart suggested that a fabric dam—inflatable with freshwater or air—could block the Yarlung Tsangpo Canyon upstream of Namcha Barwa. Water would then be conveyed via a hard rock tunnel to a point downstream from that mountain.
 
Steel dams are more advantageous and economical in remote hilly terrain at high altitude for diverting the run off water of the river to power generating units.

References in media

 The gorges may have helped inspire the idea of Shangri-La in James Hilton's book Lost Horizon in 1933.
 In the 2007 fighting game Akatsuki Blitzkampf, the biggest base and research facility of the villainous organization Gessellschaft is hidden in the Yarlung Tsangpo Grand Canyon, referred to in-story as the "Tsangpo Ravine". The second part of the game takes place in said base, with the player fighting their way inside it until they reach the last enemy.

See also
 Nyingchi
 Zangmu Dam
 South–North Water Transfer Project
 Inga dams
 Bailey–Morshead exploration of Tsangpo Gorge

Notes

References

Further reading
 Wick Walker (2000). Courting the Diamond Sow : A Whitewater Expedition on Tibet's Forbidden River. National Geographic. .
 Todd Balf (2001). The Last River : The Tragic Race for Shangri-la. Three Rivers Press. .
 Michael Mcrae (2002). The Siege of Shangri-La : The Quest for Tibet's Sacred Hidden Paradise. Broadway. . .
 Peter Heller (2004). Hell or High Water : Surviving Tibet's Tsangpo River. Rodale Books. .
 Ian Baker (2004). The Heart of the World : A journey to the last secret place. Souvenir Press. .
 F.Kingdon Ward (Author), Kenneth Cox (Editor), Ken Storm Jr (Editor), Ian Baker (Editor) Riddle of the Tsangpo Gorges: Retracing the Epic Journey of 1924–25 in South-East Tibet (Hardcover) Antique Collectors' Club Ltd (1 Jan 1999)

Videos
 Scott Lindgren (2002), "Into the Tsangpo Gorge". Slproductions. ASIN B0006FKL2Q.
 Into the Tsangpo Gorge Documentary

External links

 Into the Tsangpo Gorge (Outside Online)
 IKONOS Satellite Image of "Rainbow Falls" and "Hidden Falls"
 Douglas Gordon at University of Utah
 Touristic information

Canyons and gorges of China
Rivers of Tibet
Landforms of Tibet
Extreme points of Earth